() is the six-syllabled Sanskrit mantra particularly associated with the four-armed Shadakshari form of Avalokiteshvara, the bodhisattva of compassion. It first appeared in the Mahayana Kāraṇḍavyūhasūtra where it is also referred to as the sadaksara (six syllabled) and the paramahrdaya, or “innermost heart” of Avalokiteshvara. In this text the mantra is seen as the condensed form of all Buddhist teachings.

The precise meaning and significance of the words remains much discussed by Buddhist scholars. The literal meaning in English has been expressed as "praise to the jewel in the lotus", or as a declarative aspiration possibly meaning "I in the jewel-lotus". Padma is the Sanskrit for the Indian lotus (Nelumbo nucifera), and mani for "jewel", as in a type of spiritual "jewel" widely referred to in Buddhism. The first word, aum/om, is a sacred syllable in various Indian religions, and hum represents the spirit of enlightenment. 

In Tibetan Buddhism, this is the most ubiquitous mantra and the most popular form of religious practice, performed by laypersons and monastics alike. It is also an ever present feature of the landscape, commonly carved onto rocks, known as mani stones, painted into the sides of hills or else it is written on prayer flags and prayer wheels.

Due to the increased interactions between Chinese Buddhists and Tibetans and Mongolians during the 11th century, the mantra also entered Chinese Buddhism. The mantra has also been adapted into Chinese Taoism.

Meaning and effects

Semantic 
Mantras may be interpreted by practitioners in many ways, or even as mere sequences of sound whose effects lie beyond strict semantic meaning.

The middle part of the mantra, is often interpreted as being in the locative case, "jewel in the lotus", Sanskrit  "jewel, gem, cintamani" and the locative of  "lotus". The lotus is a symbol present throughout Indian religion, signifying purity (due to its ability to emerge unstained from the mud) and spiritual fruition (and thus, awakening). Maṇipadme is preceded by the  syllable and followed by the  syllable, both interjections without linguistic meaning, but widely known as divine sounds.

However, according to Donald Lopez (citing Tibetan grammatical sources) it is much more likely that  is in fact a vocative, addressing a bodhisattva called , "Jewel-Lotus"- an alternative epithet of the bodhisattva Avalokitesvara.

Damien Keown also notes that another theory about the meaning of the mantra is that it actually invokes a female deity named Manipadmi. This is due to evidence from texts such as the Kāraṇḍavyūhasūtra which depict the mantra as a female deity. Also, as noted by Studholme, if the word is read as a vocative, it is most likely in the feminine grammatical gender, because if masculine, it would be a highly irregular form. Thus as Lopez notes, the original meaning of the mantra could in fact be an invocation of "she of the lotus jewel", who is the vidya (wisdom) and consort of Avalokiteshvara and is equivalent to Shakti's role vis a vis Shiva.

Regarding the relationship between the jewel and the lotus, Sten Konow argued that it could either refer to "a lotus that is a jewel" or to "a jewel in the lotus". He argues that the second explanation makes more sense, indicating Shaivite influence through the imagery of the lingam and the yoni, both also terms associated with mani and padma respectively. Thus the mantra could in fact mean "O, she with the jewel in her lotus".

According to Alexander Studholme however, the meaning of manipadme "should be parsed as a tatpurusa, or 'determinative', compound in the (masculine or neuter) locative case", meaning "in the jewel-lotus", or "in the lotus made of jewels", which refers to:the manner in which buddhas and bodhisattvas are said to be seated in these marvelous blooms and, in particular, to the manner in which more mundane beings are believed to appear in the pure land of the buddhas. Given the predominance, in the Kāraṇḍavyūha and in the Mahayana in general, of the religious goal of the pure land of Amitabha, it may be safely assumed that  would have been quite naturally associated with the mode of the rebirth of human beings there.

According to the Kāraṇḍavyūhasūtra 

The first known description of the mantra appears in the Kāraṇḍavyūhasūtra (“The Basket’s Display”, c. 4-5th centuries), which is part of certain Mahayana canons such as the Tibetan. In this sutra, Shakyamuni Buddha states, "This is the most beneficial mantra. Even I made this aspiration to all the million Buddhas and subsequently received this teaching from Buddha Amitabha."

The sutra promotes the recitation of this mantra as a means to liberation. It states that whoever knows (janati) the mantra will know liberation as a fully enlightened Buddha. It also states that initiation into the mantra by a qualified preceptor (which is said to be a lay dharmabhanaka, vidyadhara or mahasiddha) is an important requirement for practicing this mantra. In the sutra, Avalokitesvara says that the mantra should not be given to one who has not seen the mandala. This initiation is said to be open to all Buddhists regardless of class and gender, whether they be of the Mahayana or Hinayana, but not to tirthikas.

The Kāraṇḍavyūhasūtra also sees the mantra as the pith or condensed expression of all "eighty four thousand Dharmas". Because of this it is called "the grain of rice of the Mahayana", and reciting it is equivalent to reciting numerous sutras.

Thus, according to Studholme, the significance of the mantra in the Kāraṇḍavyūha is mainly that it is the "innermost heart" of Avalokitesvara, and therefore is "a means both of entering into the presence of Avalokitesvara and of appropriating some of the bodhisattva's power". Its practice is said to lead numerous positive qualities including:

 The seeing (darsana) the bodhisattva's "thousand-fold" form, 
 Rebirth into the myriad worlds contained in the pores of the bodhisattva's body 
 Innumerable samadhis (meditative absorptions), including the samadhi of "rejoicing in loving kindness and compassion" (maitri-karuna-mudito). 
 The development of "great compassion" (maha karuna)
 Accumulation of immeasurable merit
 Accomplishment of the six perfections
 Awakening (bodhi)

In this sutra, the sadaksari mahavidya (six syllabled great vidya) also appears as a goddess, "autumn yellow" in color, with four arms, with two arms holding a lotus and prayer beads, and the other two in anjali mudra. According to Studholme, these features are similar to the way the mantra Om nama shivaya is depicted in Shaiva texts, since "both are concise vidyas, the hrdayas [heart] of their respective isvaras, sui generis means of attaining liberation, universally available, though of rare value and somewhat secret. Both are also, it has been argued, conceived of as forms of pranava [divine sound]."

The Kāraṇḍavyūhasūtra was translated into Chinese in the 11th or 12th century and is part of the Chinese Buddhist canon.

In Tibetan Buddhism 

The 11th-century Bengali master Atiśa Dīpaṃkara Śrījñāna, who was influential in bringing Buddhism to Tibet, also wrote a short treatise on the mantra called the Arya-sad-aksari-sadhana. Some Buddhist scholars argue that the mantra as practiced in Tibetan Buddhism was based on the Sadhanamala, a collection of sadhana or spiritual practices published in the 12th century. However, according to Peter Alan Roberts, "the primary source for Tibetan Avalokitesvara practices and teachings" is the 11th-century Maṇi Kambum.

Donald Lopez writes that according to a 17th-century work by the prime minister of the fifth Dalai Lama, the meaning of the mantra is said to be "O, you who have the jewel and the lotus." That manipadme is in the vocative case is also supported by a 9th-century Tibetan grammatical treatise.

Lopez also notes that the majority of Tibetan Buddhist texts have regarded the translation of the mantra as secondary, focusing instead on the correspondence of the six syllables of the mantra to various other groupings of six in the Buddhist tradition.

For example, in the Chenrezig Sadhana, Tsangsar Tulku Rinpoche expands upon the mantra's meaning, taking its six syllables to represent the purification of the six realms of existence:

According to Trijang Rinpoche 
The tutor to the present Dalai Lama, Trijang Rinpoche (1901-1981) wrote a commentary on the mantra which states: Regarding mani padme, "Jewel Lotus" or "Lotus Jewel" is one of the names of the noble Avalokitesvara. The reason that he is called by that is that, just as a lotus is not soiled by mud, so the noble Avalokitesvara himself has, through his great wisdom, abandoned the root of samsara, all the stains of the conception of true existence together with its latencies. Therefore, to symbolize that he does not abide in the extreme of mundane existence, he holds a white lotus in his hand...He joins the palms of his two upper hands, making the gesture of holding a jewel to symbolize that, like a wish-granting jewel, he eliminates all the oppression of suffering for all sentient beings and bestows upon them all temporary and ultimate benefit and bliss.

According to the 14th Dalai Lama 
"It is very good to recite the mantra Om mani padme hung, but while you are doing it, you should be thinking on its meaning, for the meaning of the six syllables is great and vast... The first, Om [...] symbolizes the practitioner's impure body, speech, and mind; it also symbolizes the pure exalted body, speech, and mind of a Buddha[...]"

"The path of the middle way is indicated by the next four syllables. Mani, meaning jewel, symbolizes the factors of method: (the) altruistic intention to become enlightened, compassion, and love.[...]"

"The two syllables, padme, meaning lotus, symbolize wisdom[...]"

"Purity must be achieved by an indivisible unity of method and wisdom, symbolized by the final syllable hung, which indicates indivisibility[...]"

"Thus the six syllables, om mani padme hung, mean that in dependence on the practice of a path which is an indivisible union of method and wisdom, you can transform your impure body, speech, and mind into the pure exalted body, speech, and mind of a Buddha[...]"

—Tenzin Gyatso, 14th Dalai Lama, "On the meaning of: OM MANI PADME HUNG"

Dilgo Khyentse Rinpoche 

 "The mantra Om Mani Pädme Hum is easy to say yet quite powerful, because it contains the essence of the entire teaching. When you say the first syllable Om it is blessed to help you achieve perfection in the practice of generosity, Ma helps perfect the practice of pure ethics, and Ni helps achieve perfection in the practice of tolerance and patience. Pä, the fourth syllable, helps to achieve perfection of perseverance, Me helps achieve perfection in the practice of concentration, and the final sixth syllable Hum helps achieve perfection in the practice of wisdom.

 "So in this way recitation of the mantra helps achieve perfection in the six practices from generosity to wisdom. The path of these six perfections is the path walked by all the Buddhas of the three times. What could then be more meaningful than to say the mantra and accomplish the six perfections?"
—Dilgo Khyentse Rinpoche, Heart Treasure of the Enlightened Ones

Transliterations 
In English, the mantra is variously transliterated, depending on the schools of Buddhism as well as individual teachers.

Most authorities consider maṇipadme to be one compound word rather than two simple words. Sanskrit writing does not have capital letters and this means that capitalisation of transliterated mantras varies from all caps, to initial caps, to no caps. The all-caps rendering is typical of older scholarly works, and Tibetan Sadhana texts.

 IAST (Roman alphabet): 
 Tibetan:  (Tibetan Pinyin: Om Mani Bêmê Hum)
 Sanskrit:  (oṃ maṇipadme hūṃ)
 Mongolian: 
 Classical Mongolian:  (Owam mani padme huum)
 Khalkha: Ум мани бадмэ хум (Um mani badme khum)
 Buryat: Ом маани бадмэ хум (Om maani badme khum)
 Kalmyk: Ом мани бадме хум (Om mani badme xum)
 'Phags pa: ʼom ma ni pad me hung 
 Manchu:  (Om mani padme hüüm)
 Tangut:  ·a mja nji pja mjij xo 
 Old Uyghur: oom mani badmi xung 
 Jurchen:  am ma ni ba mi xu
 Meitei (Manipuri):  (ōm manee padme hūng) 
 Vietnamese: Án ma ni bát di hồng
 Siddham: 𑖌𑖼 𑖦𑖜𑖰 𑖢𑖟𑖿𑖦𑖸 𑖮𑖲𑖼
 Lepcha: ᰣᰨᰵ ᰕᰍᰧ ᰎᰳᰕᰬ ᰝᰫᰵ
 Limbu: ᤀᤥᤱ ᤔᤏᤡ ᤐᤍ᤻ᤔᤣ ᤜ᤺ᤢᤱ
 Brahmi: 𑀑𑀁 𑀫𑀡𑀺 𑀧𑀤𑁆𑀫𑁂 𑀳𑀽𑀁
 Hindi: ॐ मणि पद्मे हूँ (om mani padme hum)
 Telugu: ఓం మణి పద్మే హుం
 Nepali: ॐ मणि पद्मे हुँ
 Pracalit (Newari): 𑑉 𑐩𑐞𑐶 𑐥𑐡𑑂𑐩𑐾 𑐴𑐸𑑃
 Assamese:  (Öm Moni Podme hum)
 Bengali:  (Om Moni Pôdde hum)
 Odia: ଓ‍ଁ ମଣି ପଦ୍ମେ ହୁଁ (Oṃ Maṇi Padme Huṃ)
 
 Tamil: ௐ மணி பத்மே ஹூம்
 Malayalam: ഓം മണി പദ്മേ ഹും
 Kannada: ಓಂ ಮಣಿ ಪದ್ಮೇ ಹುಂ
 Grantha: 𑍐 𑌮𑌣𑌿 𑌪𑌦𑍍𑌮𑍇 𑌹𑍂𑌁
 Chakma: 𑄃𑄮𑄀 𑄟𑄧𑄕𑄨 𑄛𑄧𑄘𑄳𑄟𑄬 𑄦𑄪𑄀
 Burmese: 
 Mon: ဥုံမဏိပဒၟေဟုံ
 Shan: ဢုုံမꧣိပၻ်မေႁုံ
 Lanna: ᩒᩴ ᨾᨱᩥ ᨸᨴ᩠ᨾᩮ ᩉᩪᩴ
 Thai: โอํ มณิ ปทฺเม หุํ
 Khmer: ឱំ មណិ បទ្មេ ហុំ
 Lao: ໂອໍ ມະນິ ປັທເມ ຫຸໍ
 Cham: ꨀꨯꨱꩌ ꨠꨘꨪ ꨚꩅꨠꨯꨮ ꨨꨭꨩꩃ
 Balinese: ᬑᬁ ᬫᬡᬶ ᬧᬤ᭄ᬫᬾ ᬳᬸᬁ
 Javanese: ꦎꦀ ꦩꦟꦶ ꦥꦢ꧀ꦩꦺ ꦲꦸꦀ
 Tagalog (Filipino):  Um mani pad mi hum

Variations 

As Bucknell et al. (1986, p. 15.) say, the complete Avalokiteshvara Mantra includes a final hrīḥ, which is iconographically depicted in the central space of the syllabic mandala as seen in the ceiling decoration of the Potala Palace. The full mantra in Tibetan is thus:  ཨོཾ་མ་ཎི་པདྨེ་ཧཱུྃ་ཧྲཱིཿ The hrīḥ is not always vocalized audibly and may be resonated "internally" or "secretly" through intentionality.

According to Sam Van Schaik, Tibetan works from Dunhuang which was a major cult center of Avalokitesvara, contain numerous mantras associated with this figure, the six syllable mantra only being one of many. Some of these are lesser known variations on the six syllable mantra such as: Om vajra yaksa mani padme hum.

Another variation, noted by Peter Alan Roberts, is Om manipadme hum mitra svaha.

See also 
 Ye Dharma Hetu
 Maṇi Kambum
 Ashtamangala
 Great Compassion Mantra – Expanded Compassion of Om Mani Padma Hum
 Heart sutra
 Samsara
 Samsara (2011 film)
 Shurangama Mantra – Expanded Protective Power of Om Mani Padma Hum
 Desire realm

Notes

References 
 Teachings from the Mani retreat, Chenrezig Institute, December 2000 (2001) by Lama Zopa Rinpoche, Lama Yeshe Wisdom Archive downloadable
 Bucknell, Roderick & Stuart-Fox, Martin (1986). The Twilight Language: Explorations in Buddhist Meditation and Symbolism. Curzon Press: London. 
 Lopez, Donald (1998).  Prisoners of Shangri-La: Tibetan Buddhism and the West.  University of Chicago Press: Chicago.  .

Further reading
Alexander Studholme: The Origins of Om Manipadme Hum. Albany NY: State University of New York Press, 2002  (incl. Table of Contents)
Mark Unno: Shingon Refractions: Myōe and the Mantra of Light. Somerville MA, USA: Wisdom Publications, 2004 
Bucknell, Roderick & Stuart-Fox, Martin (1986). The Twilight Language: Explorations in Buddhist Meditation and Symbolism. Curzon Press: London. 
Buswell, Robert E. Jr. & Lopez, Donald S. Jr.. The Princeton Dictionary of Buddhism. Princeton University Press, Princeton, NJ., 2014(p. 603).
A.H. Francke: The Meaning of Om Mani Padme-Hum, Journal of the Royal Asiatic Society, 1915
Orzech, Charles; Sørensen, Henrik; Payne, Richard; Esoteric Buddhism and the Tantras in East Asia, BRILL, 2011.
Lama Anagarika Govinda: Foundations of Tibetan Mysticism, 1969. Samuel Weiser, Inc: NYC, NY. .
Lopez, D. S. (jr.) Prisoners of Shangri-la : Tibetan Buddhism and the West. Chicago University Press, 1988. (p. 114ff.)
Rodger Kamenetz: The Jew in the Lotus (PLUS) with an afterword by the author. (HarperOne, 2007) non-fiction. Table of Contents
Schaik, Sam Van. The Tibetan Avalokitesvara cult in the tenth century: Evidence from the Dunhuang manuscripts.  in "Tibetan Buddhist Literature and Praxis: Studies in Its Formative Period, 900-1400 : PIATS 2003 : Tibetan Studies : Proceedings of the Tenth Seminar of the International Association for Tibetan Studies, Oxford, 2003"
Sogyal Rinpoche: The Tibetan Book of Living and Dying, Appendix 4 pg. 396–398, Rider, 10th Anniversary Edition, 2002

External links 

 Dharma Haven: Om Mani Padme Hum
 Khandro.net: Mantra
 Om Mani Padme Hum: a Sufi interpretation
 Andrew West, An article on Om Mani Padme Hum in different scripts
 Buddha speaks Mahayana Sublime Treasure King Sutra English translation of Karandavyuha Sutra
 sung tune of Mani mantra derived from Karma Pakshi tradition (13th century CE) 

Buddhist mantras
Sanskrit words and phrases
Culture in Kyzyl
Avalokiteśvara
Om mantras